Großer See (Pinnow) is a lake in the Vorpommern-Greifswald district in Mecklenburg-Vorpommern, Germany. At an elevation of 10 m, its surface area is 0.64 km².

External links 
 

Lakes of Mecklenburg-Western Pomerania